Andrew Joseph Ernest Raycroft (born May 4, 1980) is a Canadian former professional ice hockey goaltender.  Originally drafted by the Boston Bruins of the National Hockey League (NHL) 135th overall in 1998, he won the Calder Memorial Trophy with the club in 2004 as rookie of the year. Raycroft has also played for the Toronto Maple Leafs, Colorado Avalanche, Vancouver Canucks, Dallas Stars, Hockey Milano Rossoblu and IF Björklöven.

Since 2014, he has been a volunteer assistant coach for the University of Connecticut's men's hockey team. Raycroft is currently a studio analyst for the Boston Bruins broadcasts on NESN and a host on the hockey podcast Breaking The Ice.

Playing career

Early years/Boston Bruins
Prior to entering the junior hockey ranks, Raycroft grew up playing minor hockey with the Quinte Red Devils AAA system in the Eastern Ontario AAA League of the Ontario Minor Hockey Association (OMHA). In 1997–98, he began a three-year career in the Ontario Hockey League (OHL), playing for the Kingston Frontenacs and Sudbury Wolves. He also played junior for the Wellington Dukes of the Ontario Provincial Junior A Hockey League (OPJAHL).

Raycroft was drafted 135th overall by the Boston Bruins in the 1998 NHL Entry Draft. He made his NHL debut in 2000–01 with the Bruins, replacing Byron Dafoe in a 5–1 victory over the Philadelphia Flyers. However, as a late-game replacement, he was not given the decision. Raycroft recorded his first NHL win two days later on October 9 in a 4–2 win over the Florida Panthers.  Raycroft played 11 games total for the Bruins in his first season, while playing the majority of his first three professional seasons with the team's minor league affiliate, the Providence Bruins of the American Hockey League (AHL).

After the Bruins renewed his contract on July 31, 2003,  Raycroft played his first full NHL season in 2003–04, compiling a 29–18–9 record with a 2.05 goals against average (GAA), .926 save percentage and three shutouts.  He helped lead the Bruins to a second-place finish in the regular season in the Eastern Conference en route to the 2004 Stanley Cup playoffs. Not having played enough games to qualify as a rookie in his previous three NHL seasons, Raycroft was awarded the Calder Memorial Trophy in 2004 as league rookie of the year.

Due to the 2004–05 NHL lockout, Raycroft signed with Djurgårdens IF of the Swedish Elitserien on November 6, 2004. However, he did not play any games for the team and signed with Tappara Tampere of the Finnish SM-liiga several months later on January 17, 2005. When NHL play resumed, he struggled with the Bruins in the 2005–06 season, managing only eight wins while being a healthy scratch for the majority of the season. He was demoted to the Bruins' third-string position to starter Tim Thomas and rookie backup Hannu Toivonen.

Toronto Maple Leafs
The following off-season, on June 24, 2006, Raycroft was traded to the Toronto Maple Leafs in exchange for the rights to Finnish goaltending prospect Tuukka Rask. It was later revealed the Bruins intended to release him, which would have made him available to Toronto without any compensation at all. He began playing for the Maple Leafs in the 2006–07 season and earned his first shutout and win as a Leaf in a 6-0 victory against the Ottawa Senators on October 5, 2006. On April 3, 2007, Raycroft tied the Leafs' franchise record for most wins by a goaltender in the regular season (37), previously held by Ed Belfour in 2002–03 (Raycroft played more games than Belfour and earned three shootout wins, which did not exist prior to the 2005–06 season). Despite this record, he finished 49th in GAA and 56th in save percentage as the Leafs failed to qualify for the playoffs.

Raycroft struggled at the start of the 2007–08 season and surrendered the starting position to Vesa Toskala. The Leafs then placed him on waivers on June 24, 2008,
and bought out the remainder of his contract on June 27.

Colorado Avalanche
Several days after being bought out by the Maple Leafs, on July 1, he signed a one-year deal with the Colorado Avalanche. Despite being brought in to back-up Peter Budaj, Raycroft started the 2008–09 season strong, becoming only the second Avalanche goaltender to begin a season with a 9–1 record. In 31 games with the Avalanche, Raycroft posted a 12-16-0 record with a 3.14 GAA.

Vancouver Canucks
On July 6, 2009, Raycroft signed a one-year contract with the Vancouver Canucks. He earned the backup position behind Roberto Luongo after competing with prospect Cory Schneider during training camp. He recorded his first win with the Canucks in his first start on October 29 in a 2–1 shootout win against the Los Angeles Kings after Luongo was sidelined with a fractured rib. Raycroft faced his former Avalanche teammates several days later on November 1 and recorded his first shutout as a Canuck in a 3–0 win. Raycroft won his 100th NHL career game on February 12, 2010, in a 4–3 win over the Columbus Blue Jackets.

Dallas Stars
On July 1, 2010, Raycroft signed a two-year contract as a free agent with the Dallas Stars. He compiled an 8–5 record with a 2.83 GAA in his first season in Dallas, backing-up Stars starter Kari Lehtonen.

On December 29, 2011, Raycroft was assigned to the Texas Stars, the Dallas Stars' AHL affiliate. Richard Bachman replaced Raycroft as backup to the Stars starter Lehtonen. He played in the minors for the remainder of his contract.

Europe
On July 3, 2012, with little NHL interest and an impending lockout on the horizon, Raycroft left his North American career to begin a new venture in Europe by signing to a one-year deal with Italian Serie A club, Milano Rossoblu. The Italian team has been in proposed talks to join the Kontinental Hockey League (KHL).

On July 15, 2013, it was announced Raycroft would join IF Björklöven for the 2013–14 season.

On April 9, 2014, Raycroft announced his retirement from professional hockey. He has since joined the Connecticut Huskies men's ice hockey as a volunteer assistant coach.

Career statistics

Regular season and playoffs

Awards
OHL
Named to the First All-Star Team in 1999–2000.
Named the OHL Goaltender of the Year in 1999–2000.
Won the Red Tilson Trophy in 1999–2000.
CHL
Named to the First All-Star Team in 1999–2000.
Named CHL Goaltender of the Year in 1999–2000.
NHL
Played in the NHL YoungStars Game in 2003–04.
Won the Calder Memorial Trophy in 2003–04.
Named to the NHL All-Rookie Team in 2003–04.

References

External links

Andrew Raycroft on HockeyGoalies.org

1980 births
Boston Bruins draft picks
Boston Bruins players
Calder Trophy winners
Canadian ice hockey goaltenders
Colorado Avalanche players
Dallas Stars players
Ice hockey people from Ontario
IF Björklöven players
Kingston Frontenacs players
Living people
Providence Bruins players
Sportspeople from Belleville, Ontario
Sudbury Wolves players
Tappara players
Texas Stars players
Toronto Maple Leafs players
Vancouver Canucks players
Canadian expatriate ice hockey players in Italy
Canadian expatriate ice hockey players in Finland
Canadian expatriate ice hockey players in Sweden